Island Field may refer to:

Island Field, Limerick, Ireland
Island Field Site, Delaware, United States

See also